The Blue Squadron (Spanish: Escuadrilla Azul, German: 15. Spanische Staffel) was a generic name given to the group of volunteer pilots and ground crews recruited from the Spanish Air Force that fought in the side of Germany on the Eastern Front, during the Second World War. The "Blue Patrol" was a counterpart offered by Franco to Nazi Germany for its help with the Condor Legion during the Spanish Civil War.

Between September 1941 and May 1943 five Spanish squadrons rotated through the Eastern Front, attached to Luftwaffe fighter wings Jagdgeschwader 27 and Jagdgeschwader 51.

Flying Messerschmitt fighters and Focke-Wulf fighter-bombers, the Spaniards were credited with destroying more than 160 Soviet aircraft in nearly two years, while losing 20 pilots killed, missing, or captured. The unit remained in central Russia, despite requests by Muñoz Grandes that they be attached to the Blue Division, until their withdrawal in 1943.

References

Sources
 Bowen, Wayne H. Spain during World War II. University of Missouri Publishing, (2006). 
 Neulen, Hans Werner.  "In the Skies of Europe: Air Forces Allied to the Luftwaffe 1939–1945."  Crowood Press, UK (2000).  .

Foreign volunteer units of the Luftwaffe
Military units and formations of Spain
Military units and formations of the Soviet–German War
Military units and formations established in 1941
Francoist Spain
Soviet Union–Spain relations
Military units and formations disestablished in 1943